Re:Mind is a Japanese psychological thriller streaming television series, which was released on Netflix on October 13, 2017, and also broadcast on TV Tokyo starting October 19. The series was produced by Akira Uchikata, Yusuke Ishida, and Yusuke Koroyasu, and features cast members from the Japanese idol girl group Hiragana Keyakizaka46 (now Hinatazaka46).

Plot
After awaking in an old European-style room, eleven high school classmates find themselves sitting at a large dining room table, with their feet shackled to the floor. They find that their situation could be related to another classmate named Miho who had disappeared months before. As they try to figure out how to escape, some of the girls start disappearing from the table one by one. The girls realize they each share a checkered past with Miho, but also suspect one of them could be behind the trap.

Cast
The main characters are played by the first generation members (except Miho Watanabe) of the Japanese idol group Hiragana Keyakizaka46. They go by their real given names:
 Mirei Sasaki
 Sarina Ushio
 Mei Higashimura
 Ayaka Takamoto
 Kyōko Saitō
 Kumi Sasaki
 Shiho Katō
 Yūka Kageyama
 Mao Iguchi
 Mana Takase
 Memi Kakizaki
 Miho Watanabe
 portrayed their former teacher, Mr. Hayashi.

Production
Re:Mind is produced by Tokyo TV and Netflix.

Neru Nagahama was originally planned to appear, but she left Hiragana Keyakizaka46 in September 2017. An audition was held among the second generation members, who recently joined the group in August, and Miho Watanabe was selected to replace Nagahama in her role. The last episode, titled "Re:Wind", is a special flashback episode depicting the main characters' relationships before the events of the main story; Nao Kosaka portrayed the main character of the episode, while the rest of the second generation members appeared as background characters, all named after themselves.

Staff
 Planning - Original - Yasushi Akimoto
 Screenplay - Yoshimichi Murooka, Hirofumi Tanaka, Daisuke Hosaka
 Music - Taro Makito
 Theme Song -  by Hiragana Keyakizaka46
 Producer - Kentaro Yamato, Satoshi Egawa, Toshiya Nomura
 Co-Producer - Nakadake Take
 Associate Producer - Fumiaki Kobayashi
 Contents Producer - Naofumi Takiyama, Yuzo Kikuma
 Director - Akira Uchikata, Yusuke Ishida, Goroyasu YuRyo, Tsuyoshi Furukawa
 Production - TV TOKYO, Netflix
 Production work - "Re: Mind" Production Committee

Reception
Kirsten Howard of Den of Geek said "Re:Mind is sweet, sweet binge fodder for mystery junkies".

References

External links
  at TV Tokyo 

Psychological thriller television series
Japanese horror fiction television series
Japanese-language Netflix original programming